The Decentralized Administration of Thessaly and Central Greece is one of the seven decentralized administrations of Greece, consisting of the peripheries of Thessaly and Central Greece. Seated in Larissa, Thessaly, it is currently led by Acting Secretary-General Ilias Tseligas.

Formation and tasks

Decentralized Administrations were created in January 2011 as part of a far-reaching reform of the country's administrative structure, the Kallikratis reform (Law 3852/2010).

They enjoy both administrative and financial autonomy and exercise devolved state powers in urban planning, environmental and energy policy, forestry, migration and citizenship. Beyond that, they are tasked with supervising the first and second-level self-governing bodies: the municipalities and regions, in this case the 50 municipalities of Thessaly and Central Greece, and the two regions themselves.

Characteristics
With an overall population of ,it is however only medium-sized by population.

In the revised European NUTS nomenclature, the regions of Thessaly and Central Greece together with the three regions of the Decentralized Administration of Peloponnese, Western Greece and the Ionian form the first level NUTS region EL6 (Kentriki Ellada).

Secretary-General
The Decentralized Administration is led by a Secretary-General who is appointed or dismissed by a Cabinet decision upon request of the Greek Minister of Interior, and is therefore considered the senior representative of the national government in the regions.

Following the electoral victory of Syriza in January 2015, the new Minister for the Interior, Nikos Voutsis, declared that the decentralized administrations would be abolished, and their powers transferred to the regions. Until this reform is formalized, and as the Secretaries-General appointed by the previous administration resigned on 2 February, the decentralized administrations are run by their senior civil servants as Acting Secretaries-General.

Current Acting Secretary-General is Ilias Tseligas.

References

Literature

External links
  

2011 establishments in Greece
Thessaly
Central Greece
Thessaly